The 1969 Swedish speedway season was the 1969 season of motorcycle speedway in Sweden.

Individual

Individual Championship
The 1969 Swedish Individual Speedway Championship final was held on 18 September in Gothenburg. Ove Fundin won the Swedish Championship for the eighth time.

Junior Championship
 
Karl Erik Claesson won the Junior Championship.

Team

Team Championship
Getingarna won division 1 and were declared the winners of the Swedish Speedway Team Championship for the seventh time (and sixth time in the last seven years). The Getingarna team included Anders Michanek, Bengt Jansson and Leif Enecrona .

Örnarna won the second division, while Bysarna and Eldarna won the third division east and west respectively.

See also 
 Speedway in Sweden

References

Speedway leagues
Professional sports leagues in Sweden
Swedish
Seasons in Swedish speedway